The Art of The Trio is a studio album by pianist Sonny Clark. It features alternate takes of three October 1957 pieces originally appeared on Sonny Clark Trio, while the new tracks were recorded on November 16, 1958. The album was released only in Japan in 1980 as GXF 3069, then reissued, again in Japan, in the 1990s as The 45 Sessions featuring an alternate take of "Gee Baby, Ain't I Good To You?". The tracks #4-9 can be found on the compilation Standards and on the 2014 Japanese release of Blues in the Night; tracks #1-3 are included on the CD reissue of Sonny Clark Trio.

Track listing 
 "Tadd's Delight" [Alternate Take] - 5:01
 "Two Bass Hit" [Alternate Take] - 4:01
 "I Didn't Know What Time It Was" (Richard Rodgers, Lorenz Hart)  [Alternate Take] - 4:25
 "Ain't No Use" (Leroy Kirkland, Sidney Wyche) - 4:49
 "Black Velvet" (Illinois Jacquet, Jimmy Mundy) - 3:23
 "I'm Just a Lucky So-and-So (Mack David, Duke Ellington) - 4:33
 "Gee, Baby, Ain't I Good to You" (Andy Razaf, Don Redman) - 4:01
 "The Breeze and I" (Tutti Camarata, Ernesto Lecuona, Al Stillman) - 4:00
 "I Can't Give You Anything But Love" (Dorothy Fields, Jimmy McHugh) - 3:52

Personnel
Tracks 1-3
Sonny Clark - piano
Paul Chambers - bass
Philly Joe Jones - drums

Tracks 4-9
Sonny Clark - piano
Jymie Merritt - bass
Wes Landers - drums

References 

Sonny Clark albums
1980 albums
Albums produced by Alfred Lion
Blue Note Records albums